SDN can stand for:

 S4C Digital Networks, UK TV company
 SAP Developer Network
 Sandane Airport, Anda, Norway 
 Scottish Daily News, a newspaper published in 1975
 Scottish Digital Network, proposed in 2011
 Sebacoyldinalbuphine
 Sexually dimorphic nucleus, a cluster of cells in the brain
 Sholavandan railway station, Madurai, Tamil Nadu, India, station code
 Société des Nations, French for League of Nations
 Software-defined networking, an approach to computer networking
 Specially Designated Nationals with whom US persons may not do business
 St Denys railway station, station code
 Student Doctor Network in North America
 Sydenham railway station, Sydney, station code